The State Highway 79 Bridge at the Red River was a bridge carrying Texas State Highway 79 and Oklahoma State Highway 79 over the Red River at the Texas-Oklahoma state line. The Texas and Oklahoma highway departments built the bridge as a combined project in 1939. The bridge provided a direct route between Waurika, Oklahoma and Byers and Wichita Falls in Texas. The bridge was the only camelback pony truss bridge remaining on a Texas state highway and the fourth-longest truss bridge in the Texas state highway system prior to being demolished.

The bridge was added to the National Register of Historic Places on December 20, 1996.

In 2018, a new bridge was built at the location of the old bridge before the old bridge was demolished.

See also

National Register of Historic Places listings in Jefferson County, Oklahoma
National Register of Historic Places listings in Clay County, Texas
List of bridges on the National Register of Historic Places in Oklahoma
List of bridges on the National Register of Historic Places in Texas

References

Road bridges on the National Register of Historic Places in Texas
Road bridges on the National Register of Historic Places in Oklahoma
Bridges completed in 1939
Buildings and structures in Clay County, Texas
Buildings and structures in Jefferson County, Oklahoma
Truss bridges in the United States
Red River of the South
National Register of Historic Places in Jefferson County, Oklahoma
National Register of Historic Places in Clay County, Texas